Diwang International Commerce Center is a 54-floor 276 meter (906 foot) tall skyscraper completed in 2006 located in Nanning, China.

See also
 List of tallest buildings in the world
 List of tallest buildings in China

External links

Buildings and structures completed in 2006
Skyscrapers in Guangxi
Buildings and structures in Nanning
2006 establishments in China
Skyscraper office buildings in China
Skyscraper hotels in China
Retail buildings in China